Kremena Prodanova (born 30 August 1992) is a Bulgarian footballer who plays as a midfielder. She has been a member of the Bulgaria women's national team.

References

1992 births
Living people
Women's association football midfielders
Bulgarian women's footballers
Bulgaria women's international footballers
FC NSA Sofia players